Félix Boisselier "the elder" (13 April 1776 – 12 January 1811) was a French historical painter.

Boisselier was born at Damphal (Haute-Marne), and in early life was employed as draughtsman in a manufactory of decorative papers. At the time of the Revolution he was thrown into prison, and after regaining his liberty entered the studio of Regnault. In 1805, and again in 1806, he obtained the grand prize in painting, and towards the end of the latter year went to Rome, where he died in 1811. His 'Death of Adonis,' exhibited in 1812, is now in the Louvre.

References
 

1776 births
1811 deaths
People from Haute-Marne
18th-century French painters
French male painters
19th-century French painters
French history painters
Prix de Rome for painting
19th-century painters of historical subjects
19th-century French male artists
18th-century French male artists